Tecution is a genus of spiders from Saint Helena within the family Cheiracanthiidae. They were first described and named by Benoit in 1977. It was originally placed in the Clubionidae, but it was moved to Miturgidae in 1997, then to Cheiracanthiidae (syn. Eutichuridae) by Ramírez in 2014. The genus consists of three species.

Species
, the World Spider Catalog accepted the following species:

Tecution helenicola Benoit, 1977 – St. Helena
Tecution mellissi (O. Pickard-Cambridge, 1873) – St. Helena
Tecution planum (O. Pickard-Cambridge, 1873) (type species) – St. Helena

References

Araneomorphae genera
Fauna of Saint Helena
Spiders of Africa